The Roman Catholic Diocese of Kafanchan is a diocese located in the city of Kafanchan in the Ecclesiastical province of Kaduna in Nigeria.

History
 July 10, 1995: Established as Diocese of Kafanchan from Metropolitan Archdiocese of Jos and Metropolitan Archdiocese of Kaduna

Special churches
The Cathedral is St Peter Claver's Cathedral in Kafanchan.

Leadership
 Bishops of Kafanchan (Roman rite)
 Bishop Joseph Danlami Bagobiri (1995-2018)
 Bishop Julius Kundi (2019- )

Persecution and insecurity
Due to its location, the Diocese of Kafanchan has been subjected to cases of persecution or violence committed against its faithful and members of the clergy. In 2022 a priest was murdered following a kidnapping. Fr Mark Cheitnum was the communications director for the diocese and was kidnapped along with Fr Donatus Cleopas. According to Cleopas, who managed to later escape his abductors, Fr Mark was finding it difficult to keep up with the group as they were being taken into the bush, and was shot dead by his kidnappers.

Two more priests from Kafanchan diocese were kidnapped in 2022. Fr Emmanuel Silas and Fr Joseph Shekari were both eventually released.

See also
Roman Catholicism in Nigeria

References

Sources
 GCatholic.org Information
 Catholic Hierarchy

Roman Catholic dioceses in Nigeria
Christian organizations established in 1995
Roman Catholic dioceses and prelatures established in the 20th century
1995 establishments in Nigeria
Roman Catholic Ecclesiastical Province of Kaduna